Another Animal was a hard rock supergroup formed by members of Godsmack, Ugly Kid Joe, and Dropbox.

History
During the writing sessions of IV by Godsmack, lead singer Sully Erna encountered writer's block so Tony Rombola, Shannon Larkin, and Robbie Merrill went to the studio and recorded music. After writing almost 40 songs, only 14 were used (Two being bonus songs).  The left-over songs were then recycled by the members after they recruited Whitfield Crane of Ugly Kid Joe and Another Animal was born. Soon joining the band was friend and former Godsmack and Dropbox guitarist Lee Richards. The band released its self titled debut album in 2007 and first single "Broken Again" reached No. 8 on the U.S. Billboard Hot Mainstream Rock Tracks chart. To support their debut album, Another Animal opened for Alter Bridge on tour in late 2007.

Another Animal is part of the stable of artists who have recorded at Rocking Horse Studio in Pittsfield, New Hampshire.

Another Animal released a single titled "Fall of Rome". The track is produced by Dave Fortman. Drummer Shannon Larkin mentioned that if the single is a success they will make a new album, a follow up to their self-titled debut album of 2007. He said "If the song does well enough at radio, we will tour in the fall and make a new record as well." Obviously the band had not reached its goal.

Discography

Studio albums 
Another Animal (October 2, 2007)

Singles

Members
 Whitfield Crane – lead vocals (Ugly Kid Joe & Medication)
 Tony Rombola – lead guitar, backing vocals (Godsmack)
 Robbie Merrill – bass guitar (Godsmack)
 Shannon Larkin – drums, backing vocals (Godsmack, Ugly Kid Joe)
 Lee Richards – rhythm guitar, backing vocals (Dropbox, ex-Godsmack)

References

External links
 Another Animal on Myspace

Musical quintets
American hard rock musical groups
Rock music supergroups
Musical groups established in 2006